Today I Die is a short 2008 Flash game created by Argentinian game designer Daniel Benmergui. The game has been classified as an art game and requires the player to pull apart and reconstruct a poem by clicking on a number of words contained within it, changing its narrative meaning piece by piece. Kevin Veale has referred to it as an example of "interactive cinema."

Reception
The game was chosen as a finalist for the Nuovo Award for innovative games at the 2010 Independent Games Festival and also chosen for the Experimental Gameplay Workshop in 2009. Gus Mastrapa of the website The A.V. Club called it "imaginative" but called the nostalgia-inducing graphics "heavy-handed".

References

External links
 Today I Die on Benmergui's personal website

2008 video games
Art games
Browser games
Flash games
Puzzle video games
Video games developed in Argentina